McLeod may refer to:
 McLeod (surname)
 Clan MacLeod, a Highland Scottish clan associated with the Isle of Skye

Places

Canada
McLeod (Edmonton), a residential neighbourhood in Edmonton, Canada
Rural Municipality of McLeod No. 185, Saskatchewan
McLeod River, a river in west-central Alberta, Canada

United States
McLeod County, Minnesota
McLeod, Texas, an unincorporated community
McLeod, an unincorporated community in Sweet Grass County, Montana
McLeod, North Dakota
McLeod Plantation, located on James Island, South Carolina

India
McLeod Ganj, town in Himachal Pradesh, India

Medicine 
 McLeod Health, an hospital network serving the twelve counties of northeastern South Carolina
 McLeod syndrome, an X-linked recessive genetic disorder

Tools 
 McLeod (tool), a two-sided blade used for wildfire suppression and trail conservation
 McLeod gauge, a scientific instrument used to measure very low pressures

Television 
 McLeod's Daughters, an Australian television drama program

See also 
 MacLeod (disambiguation)